The Lentil Sorters is a BBC radio comedy series, written by Jack Bernhardt and starring Vincent Franklin, Rebekah Staton, Kieran Hodgson and Julia Deakin, which first aired on BBC Radio 4 in November 2015.

It is set in the Office of Local and National Statistics, and follows the day-to-day activities of the People & Places department, which is made up of: 
 Graham - Head of the People & Places Department, with a passionate love for statistics and no discernible social life.
 Audrey - the department's Survey Researcher, who loves novels and hates Daniel
 Daniel - the department's Data Analyst, an ex-city capitalist
 Mrs Wilkins - the tea lady who knows where the bodies are buried

Series One started on 11 November 2015, and the series contains four episodes in total: "Standard Deviation", "Researcher Bias", "False Positives", and "Multi-Parameter Database Search".

The series was produced and directed by David Tyler at Pozzitive Television for BBC Radio 4.

References

BBC Radio comedy programmes
2015 radio programme debuts